Eric Quigley (born January 30, 1989) is an American professional tennis player.

High school career
Quigley was a four-time Kentucky High School Athletic Association tennis champion. He attended South Oldham High School.

College career
Quigley was an All-American and NCAA runner-up for the University of Kentucky.

Professional career
In 2013, Quigley won his first professional singles tournament, an ITF Men's Circuit tournament in Decatur, Illinois.

In 2016, Quigley entered the US Open and played doubles with fellow American Nicolas Meister but they lost to Poland's Łukasz Kubot & Austria's Alexander Peya in the first round.

Quigley qualified for the main draw at the Delray Beach in 2015, but lost in the first round. This was his first ATP World Tour appearance.

ATP Challenger and ITF Futures finals

Singles: 8 (1–7)

Doubles: 15 (9–6)

References

External links

1989 births
Living people
American male tennis players
Tennis players from Cincinnati
People from Pewee Valley, Kentucky
Sportspeople from Louisville, Kentucky
Tennis people from Kentucky
Kentucky Wildcats men's tennis players